Dadhalia is a town and former Rajput princely state in Gujarat, western India.

History 
Dadhalia was a Fifth Class princely state, comprising eleven more villages, covering twenty-eight square miles in Mahi Kantha, It has been deprived of its jurisdiction as taluka due to maladministration and placed under Sabar Kantha thana.

It had a combined population of 2,619 in 1901, yielding a state revenue of 3,689 Rupees (1903-4, half from land), paying tributes of 699 Rupees to the Gaikwar Baroda State and 611 Rupees to Idar State.

Rulers
Rulers took the title of Raja Sahib.

1840 – 1860: Shamalsha
1860 – 1925: Krishnarajji
1925 – 1935: Mulrajji
1935 – 1964: Tribhovanrajji
1964 - 1990: Amolraji
1990 - 1995: Rameshji
1995 - 1998: Abhilashji
1998 - 2017: YoginaDeviji
2017 - Present : Richakumariji

Sources and external links 
 Imperial Gazetteer on dsal.uchicago.edu - Mahi Kantha

Princely states of Gujarat
Rajput princely states